The HP postcode area, also known as the Hemel Hempstead postcode area, is a group of twenty-four postcode districts in England, within eleven post towns. These cover north-west Hertfordshire (including Hemel Hempstead, Berkhamsted and Tring) and central Buckinghamshire (including Aylesbury, High Wycombe, Beaconsfield, Amersham, Chalfont St Giles, Chesham, Great Missenden and Princes Risborough).

Mail for this area is sorted at the Home Counties North Mail Centre in Hemel Hempstead.



Coverage
The approximate coverage of the postcode districts:

|-
! HP1
| HEMEL HEMPSTEAD
| Bourne End, Boxmoor, Chaulden, Fields End, Gadebridge, Great Gaddesden, Nettleden, Piccotts End, Water End, Warner's End
| Dacorum
|-
! HP2
| HEMEL HEMPSTEAD
| Gaddesden Row, Piccotts End, Grovehill, Adeyfield, Hemel Hempstead Industrial Estate
| Dacorum
|-
! HP3
| HEMEL HEMPSTEAD
| Apsley, Bovingdon, Felden, Flaunden, Hemel Hempstead, Leverstock Green
| Dacorum
|-
! HP4
| BERKHAMSTED
| Berkhamsted, Dagnall, Dudswell, Little Gaddesden, Northchurch, Potten End, Ringshall
| Dacorum, Buckinghamshire
|-
! HP5
| CHESHAM
| Chesham, Ashley Green, Bellingdon, Botley, Chartridge, Hawridge, Latimer, Lye Green, Newtown, Waterside, Whelpley Hill
| Buckinghamshire
|-
! HP6
| AMERSHAM
| Amersham (north), Chesham Bois, Hyde Heath, Little Chalfont (north)
| Buckinghamshire
|-
! HP7
| AMERSHAM
| Amersham (south), Coleshill, Little Chalfont (west and centre), Little Missenden, Penn Street, Winchmore Hill
| Buckinghamshire
|-
! HP8
| CHALFONT ST. GILES
| Chalfont St Giles, Little Chalfont (south)
| Buckinghamshire
|-
! HP9
| BEACONSFIELD
| Beaconsfield, Forty Green, Holtspur, Jordans, Knotty Green, Seer Green
| Buckinghamshire
|-
! HP10
| HIGH WYCOMBE
| High Wycombe, Flackwell Heath, Handy Cross, Hedsor, Loudwater, Penn, Tylers Green, Wooburn, Wooburn Green, Wooburn Moor
| Buckinghamshire
|-
! HP11
| HIGH WYCOMBE
| Wycombe Marsh
| Buckinghamshire
|-
! HP12
| HIGH WYCOMBE
| High Wycombe, Booker, Sands
| Buckinghamshire
|-
! HP13
| HIGH WYCOMBE
| High Wycombe, Downley, Totteridge
| Buckinghamshire
|-
! HP14
| HIGH WYCOMBE
| Beacon's Bottom, Bledlow Ridge, Bolter End, Bradenham, Cadmore End, Hughenden Valley, Ibstone, Lane End,  Naphill, Northend, Stokenchurch, The City, Upper North Dean, West Wycombe
| Buckinghamshire
|-
! HP15
| HIGH WYCOMBE
| Cryers Hill, Great Kingshill, Hazlemere, Holmer Green, Hughenden Valley
| Buckinghamshire
|-
! HP16
| GREAT MISSENDEN
| Great Missenden, Ballinger, The Lee, Little Hampden, Little Kingshill, Prestwood, South Heath
| Buckinghamshire
|-
! HP17
| AYLESBURY
| Aston Sandford, Bishopstone, Butler's Cross, Dinton, Dorton, Ellesborough, Ford, Great and Little Kimble, Kingsey, Haddenham, Meadle, Nash Lee, Stone, Upton, Westlington
| Buckinghamshire
|-
! HP18
| AYLESBURY
| Ashendon, Berryfields, Boarstall, Brill, Chearsley, Chilton, Cuddington, Dorton, Easington, Edgcott, Grendon Underwood, Ickford, Kingswood, Long Crendon, Lower Winchendon, Ludgershall, Oakley, Shabbington, Upper Winchendon, Waddesdon, Westcott, Worminghall, Wotton Underwood
| Buckinghamshire
|-
! HP19
| AYLESBURY
| Aylesbury, Berryfields, Buckingham Park, Fairford Leys, Prebendal Farm, Quarrendon, Watermead
| Buckinghamshire
|-
! HP20
| AYLESBURY
| Aylesbury, Aylesbury Town Centre, Broughton, Elmhurst
| Buckinghamshire
|-
! HP21
| AYLESBURY
| Aylesbury, Bedgrove, Elm Farm, Queens Park, Southcourt, Walton, Walton Court
| Buckinghamshire
|-
! HP22
| AYLESBURY
| Aston Abbotts, Aston Clinton, Bierton, Buckland, Drayton Beauchamp, Dunsmore, Halton, Hardwick, Hulcott, North Lee, Nup End, Oving, Pitchcott, Quainton, Rowsham, Stoke Mandeville, Weedon, Wendover, Weston Turville, Whitchurch, Wingrave
| Buckinghamshire
|-
! style="background:#FFFFFF;"|HP22
| style="background:#FFFFFF;"|PRINCES RISBOROUGH
| style="background:#FFFFFF;"|
| style="background:#FFFFFF;"|non-geographic
|-
! HP23
| TRING
| Aldbury, Buckland Common, Cholesbury, Hastoe, Long Marston, Marsworth, New Mill, Puttenham, St Leonards, Tring, Wigginton, Wilstone
| Dacorum, Buckinghamshire
|-
! HP27
| PRINCES RISBOROUGH
| Askett, Bledlow, Ilmer, Lacey Green, Longwick, Loosley Row, Monks Risborough, Owlswick, Pitch Green, Princes Risborough, Saunderton, Speen
| Buckinghamshire
|}

Map

See also
Postcode Address File
List of postcode areas in the United Kingdom

References

External links
Royal Mail's Postcode Address File
A quick introduction to Royal Mail's Postcode Address File (PAF)

Postcode areas covering South East England
Postcode areas covering the East of England